King Phalo Airport  (formerly East London Airport until 23 February 2021) is an airport serving East London, a city in the Eastern Cape province on the southeast coast of South Africa.

The airport handles between 20 and 30 flights daily, which bring  people to East London each year. In 2013, the airport served 658,363 passengers. In 2016, King Phalo Airport was voted the fastest growing airport in South Africa, having accomplished an almost 19% increase in traffic over a 12-month-period. The airport welcomed over 806,000 passengers in 2016, beating the 679,000 that passed through East London in 2015. The second best performing airport for growth in 2014 was Kimberley, with its traffic growing by 11%. Overall the top airports of South Africa witnessed nearly 39.7 million passengers in 2016, up 5.3% on the year before.

History 
The airport had an inauspicious beginning in 1927, when Lieut Colonel Alistair Miller asked the East London town council to help establish a municipal aerodrome at Woodbrook, west of the city.

Passenger flights were undertaken by two de Havilland Moth planes on Saturday afternoons and all day on Sundays, weather permitting. Flights could also be booked for weekdays, but only by special arrangement.  In 1931 it took 11 hours to fly from Windhoek in Namibia to King Phalo Airport.

In 1944 a new airport was built at Collondale, about 2 km west of the present terminal building.

In 1965 the airport was again moved, this time to its present site, 9 km west of the city centre.  Construction of the terminal buildings finished in 1966, and the airport was named after Ben Schoeman, the minister of transport at the time.

The airport was renamed in 1994. Since then, major alterations to the terminal building have been completed and a new first-floor office development for the airport management team has been added.

Infrastructure

Runways 
King Phalo Airport has two asphalt  runways: 11/29 is 1,939 by 46 meters and 06/24 is 1,585 by 46 meters.

Terminals

Facilities

Airlines and destinations

Passenger

Cargo

Traffic statistics

Incidents
 On 13 March 1967, South African Airways Flight 406 crashed into the Indian Ocean while on approach to King Phalo Airport. All 25 passengers and crew on board were killed.

See also
 List of airports in South Africa
 List of South African airports by passenger movements

References

External links
 East London Airport, official site
 
 
 

Airports in South Africa
Transport in the Eastern Cape
Buildings and structures in the Eastern Cape
East London, Eastern Cape